The roseate spoonbill (Platalea ajaja) is a gregarious wading bird of the ibis and spoonbill family, Threskiornithidae. It is a resident breeder in both South and North America. The roseate spoonbill's pink colour is diet-derived, consisting of the carotenoid pigment canthaxanthin, like the American flamingo. Plume hunting in the eighteenth and nineteenth centuries almost drove the roseate spoonbill to extinction. However, in recent years, the range of the species has expanded.

Taxonomy
The roseate spoonbill is sometimes placed in its own genus  - Ajaia. A 2010 study of mitochondrial DNA of the spoonbills by Chesser and colleagues found that the roseate and yellow-billed spoonbills were each other's closest relatives, and the two were descended from an early offshoot from the ancestors of the other four spoonbill species. They felt the genetic evidence meant it was equally valid to consider all six to be classified within the genus Platalea or alternatively the two placed in the monotypic genera Platibis and Ajaia, respectively. However, as the six species were so similar morphologically, keeping them within the one genus made more sense.

Description
The tarsus measures , the culmen measures  and the wing measures  and thus the legs, bill, neck and spatulate bill all appear elongated. Adults have a bare greenish head ("golden buff" when breeding) and a white neck, back and breast (with a tuft of pink feathers in the center when breeding), and are otherwise a deep pink. The bill is grey. There is no significant sexual dimorphism

Like the American flamingo, their pink colour is diet-derived, consisting of the carotenoid pigment canthaxanthin. Another carotenoid, astaxanthin, can also be found deposited in flight and body feathers. The colors can range from pale pink to bright magenta, depending on age, whether breeding or not, and location.  Unlike herons, spoonbills fly with their necks outstretched. They alternate groups of stiff, shallow wingbeats with glides.

Distribution
In the United States, the species is locally common in Texas, Florida, and southwest Louisiana. Generally, the species occurs in South America mostly east of the Andes, and in coastal regions of the Caribbean, Central America, Mexico, and the Gulf Coast of the United States, and from central Florida's Atlantic coast at Merritt Island National Wildlife Refuge, adjoined with NASA Kennedy Space Center at least as far north as South Carolina's Myrtle Beach. 

Plume hunting in the eighteenth and nineteenth centuries almost drove the roseate spoonbill to extinction. However, following decades of conservation efforts, and the effects climate change, the range of the roseate spoonbill has expanded considerably in the 21st century. For instance, the species was recorded breeding in the state of Georgia for the first time in 2011. Moreover, its presence in South Carolina has expanded significantly since the 1970s. 

In the summer of 2021, sightings of the bird were reported well outside its typical range, including in Washington, D.C., upstate New York, and even New Hampshire.  A large flock was spotted in Huntley Meadows Park in Fairfax County, Virginia, drawing a large crowd of spectators.

In Florida Bay, roseate spoonbills are an ecological and scientific indicator species. The number of nests varies with both the amount of fresh water and the depth of seawater there, as wetlands turn into open ocean. The birds are choosing to nest further north and inland in Florida, with sharp changes in nest locations noted in the years 2006-2020.

Behavior
The behavior of the roseate spoonbill has not been studied adequately by ornithologists. Nonetheless, it is known that this species feeds in shallow fresh or coastal waters by swinging its bill from side to side as it steadily walks through the water, often in groups. Moreover, the spoon-shaped bill allows it to sift easily through mud. 

The bird feeds on crustaceans, bits of plant material, aquatic insects, molluscs, frogs, newts and very small fish (such as minnows) ignored by larger waders. Roseate spoonbills must compete for food with snowy egrets, great egrets, tricolored herons and American white pelicans.

Breeding
The roseate spoonbill nests in shrubs or trees, often mangroves, laying two to five eggs, which are whitish with brown markings. Immature birds have white, feathered heads, and the pink of the plumage is paler. The bill is yellowish or pinkish.

Conservation and threats
Information about predation on adults is lacking. Nestlings are sometimes killed by turkey vultures, bald eagles, raccoons and fire ants. In 2022, an 18-year-old banded bird was discovered, making it the oldest known wild individual.

References

External links

 Field guide on Flickr
 
 
 
 Species account – Cornell Lab of Ornithology
 

roseate spoonbill
Native birds of the Southeastern United States
Birds of the Caribbean
Birds of the Dominican Republic
Birds of South America
Wading birds
roseate spoonbill
roseate spoonbill
Articles containing video clips
Extant Late Pleistocene first appearances